Oregon Business Development Department is an agency of the government of the U.S. state of Oregon, also known as Business Oregon, providing support of economic and community development and cultural enhancement through administration of a variety of programs of incentives, financial support, and technical assistance to businesses, nonprofit organizations and community groups, industries, and local and regional governments and districts.

It is governed by a nine-member commission, appointed by the governor, which guides department policies and strategies to implement its mission: to create, retain, expand and attract businesses that provide sustainable, living wage jobs for Oregonians through public-private partnerships, leveraged funding and support of economic opportunities for Oregon companies and entrepreneurs.

In addition, the Oregon Arts Commission receives administrative support from the agency, and the semi-privatized Oregon Film and Video Office receives direct monetary support.

Its headquarters are in Salem, Oregon, and it maintains twelve regional offices in locations throughout the state.

References

External links
 www.oregon.gov/biz

Business Oregon